The Echo Caves in Limpopo, South Africa, are set in Precambrian dolomite rock, which was first laid down about 3800 million years ago, when Africa was still part of Gondwana. The caves are considered some of the oldest in the world. The Echo Caves are about 92 km north of the similar Sudwala Caves.

There are a number of speleothem structures in the cave; two of these are hollow stalactites which when hammered create echoes audible throughout and even outside the caves, thus the name of the caves. The caves are over 40 km long; regular tours are available for about 2 km of the tunnels and chambers.

The caves were used for shelter in recent centuries by the Pedi people; they slept in what is now called the Samson chamber (due to the limestone columns which appear to hold the low roof of the cave up).

History
In the nineteenth century the Pedi lived in the Echo Caves. They used the hollow stalactites as a warning system to warn their people of attacks by neighbouring Swazi tribes. Many archeological artefacts and bones from those times are on display at the nearby Museum of Man.

In 1923, the caves were rediscovered by the owner of the farm Klipfonteinhoek, near Ohrigstad, who was looking for missing cattle. The caves were opened in 1959 as a tourist attraction. In the 1980s, more sealed caverns were discovered, and entrances created both into the existing caves and out to the hillside; the new discovery included the enormous Madonna chamber.

Tourism
The Echo caves were opened as a tourist attraction in 1959, and have been declared a National Monument. The additional caves have been included in the tours since the 1980s. Some of the chambers (up to 60m high, in places) and formations include the Madonna chamber, the Samson chamber, the Rhino Horn, the Ostrich, the hollow stalactites, and Crystal Palace.

See also
List of caves in South Africa

References

External links
Echo Caves Website
Echo Caves on Show Me
SA-Venues - Echo Caves

Caves of South Africa
Limestone caves
Landforms of Limpopo